Ogilvie Moses Farmhouse is a historic home located at Lima in Livingston County, New York. It was built during the 1830s and is an L-shaped, clapboard-sided frame farmhouse with vernacular Greek Revival style features.  The building consists of a 2-story, two-bay-wide main block with a -story, three-bay wing on the south side.  Contributing structures on the property are a smokehouse and the remains of a root cellar.

It was listed on the National Register of Historic Places in 1989.

References

Houses on the National Register of Historic Places in New York (state)
Greek Revival houses in New York (state)
Houses in Livingston County, New York
National Register of Historic Places in Livingston County, New York